Trinema is a genus of cercozoa. It includes the species Trinema lineare.

References

Cercozoa genera
Imbricatea